The Missionaries of the Sacred Hearts of Jesus and Mary was founded by Saint Gaetano Errico in 1836 in Secondigliano, Italy. It is a religious congregation of priests and brothers dedicated to serving humanity while testifying to a great love present in the sacred hearts of Jesus and Mary.

External links
 Missionaries of the Sacred Hearts of Jesus and Mary

Religious organizations established in 1836
Catholic missionary orders
Catholic religious institutes established in the 19th century
1836 establishments in Italy